Jeanne Courtemanche Auclair (born November 13, 1924) is a Canadian multidisciplinary artist born in Montreal, Quebec. She is known for her paintings, tapestries, marionettes and mosaics.

Career
Auclair studied at the École Supérieure Ste-Croix (1939-1942), and then at the École des beaux-arts de Montréal (1942-1947). Her teachers were Stanley Cosgrove and Alfred Pellan among others. 

From 1953 to 1955, Auclair began working on the second season of Pepinot and Capucine, the first television program broadcast by Radio Canada. Her job was to make and repair the marionette puppets seen on the show.

Towards the end of the 1950s she developed an interest in mosaics which she studied in Mexico in 1956. On her return to Quebec, she was an apprentice of André Vau (Montréal). Along with another artist, Auclair also created mosaic walls for the main entrance of a Quebec City seminary in 1959. One 1963 commission involved covering an entry hall with mosaics at the Centre Professionnel de Montréal.

One of Auclair's paintings graces the cover of the book Pour l'avenir du monde (2007) by André Myre.

In 1961 she received the first prize given by the Association professionnelle des artisans du Québec (APAQ).

References

External links
 Examples of Auclair’s work
 List of articles about Auclair

1924 births
Living people
20th-century Canadian artists
20th-century Canadian women artists
Artists from Montreal
Canadian multimedia artists
Canadian women artists